Introdução aos Chôros: Abertura (Introduction to the Chôros: Overture), is a composition for guitar and orchestra by the Brazilian composer Heitor Villa-Lobos, composed in 1929 as an overture to precede a complete performance of his series of fourteen Chôros. A performance of just the Introdução lasts about thirteen minutes.

History
According to Villa-Lobos, a complete presentation of his series of Chôros should be preceded by the Introdução aos Choros and concluded by the duet for violin and cello called Chôros bis, as a sort of encore. According to the official account, the Introdução aos Chôros  was composed in Rio de Janeiro and Paris in 1929.

Instrumentation
The work is scored for solo guitar (amplified) and an orchestra consisting of 2 piccolos, 2 flutes, 2 oboes, cor anglais, 2 clarinets, bass clarinet, alto saxophone, 2 bassoons, contrabassoon, 4 horns, 4 trumpets, 4 trombones, tuba, timpani, tam-tam, cymbals, xylophone, celesta, 2 harps, piano, and strings.

Analysis
The work has the form and function of a traditional symphonic overture, anticipating the themes and other aspects of the music that is to follow. The main themes are drawn from the Chôros numbers 3, 6, 7, 8, 9, 10, 12, 13, and 14. The work ends with the solo guitar, against a soft and soothing background, playing a free cadenza that prepares for the following entrance of Chôros No. 1, "which is like the essence, the embryo, the psychological model that will be developed technically in the conception of all the Chôros".

References

Cited sources

Further reading
 Appleby, David. 2002. Heitor Villa-Lobos: A Life (1887–1959). Lanham, MD: Scarecrow Press. .
 Neves, José Maria. 1977. Villa-Lobos, o choro e os choros. São Paulo: Musicália S.A.
 Nóbrega, Adhemar Alves da. 1975. Os chôros de Villa-Lobos. Rio de Janeiro: Museu Villa-Lobos.
 Seixas, Guilherme Bernstein. 2007. “Procedimentos Composicionais nos Choros Orquestrais de Heitor Villa-Lobos”. PhD diss. Rio de Janeiro: Universidade Federal do Estado de Rio de Janeiro.
 Wright, Simon. 1992. Villa-Lobos. Oxford and New York: Oxford University Press. .

External links
 Introdução aos Chôros, video recording by Turibio Santos (guitar), and the Orquestra Sinfônica do Estado de São Paulo, conducted by Diogo Pacheco (followed by a shortened version of Chôros No. 1, performed by Santos). 

Compositions by Heitor Villa-Lobos
1929 compositions